Choi Min-kyu (born August 31, 1992) is a South Korean sprint canoeist. He competed at the 2016 Summer Olympics in the men's K-2 200 metres race with Cho Kwang-hee; the two placed ninth.

References

1992 births
Living people
South Korean male canoeists
Olympic canoeists of South Korea
Canoeists at the 2016 Summer Olympics
Canoeists at the 2014 Asian Games
Asian Games medalists in canoeing
Canoeists at the 2018 Asian Games
Medalists at the 2018 Asian Games
Asian Games silver medalists for South Korea
20th-century South Korean people
21st-century South Korean people